The Journal of Musicology is a quarterly peer-reviewed academic journal of  musicology published by University of California Press. The journal was established in 1982 by Marian C. Green.

External links
 

Music journals
University of California Press academic journals
Quarterly journals
English-language journals
Publications established in 1981